"Broken Angel" is a single by Iranian singer Arash, which was released in 2010 by Warner Music. It features Swedish singer Helena. 
The music video of this song is the most-viewed music video of Arash YouTube channel.

Track listing

Charts

Weekly charts

Monthly charts

Year-end charts

Certifications

References

External links 
 

2010 songs
Arash (singer) songs
Songs written by Robert Uhlmann (composer)
Songs written by Arash (singer)